Mark Wright (1955−2017) was an Australian professional rugby league footballer for the Newtown Jets in the New South Wales Rugby League premiership competition. He was born in Moree, New South Wales. Wright also played one game of representative rugby league for New South Wales, after appearing in only eight first-grade matches.

Career playing statistics

Point scoring summary

Matches played

References

Footnotes
 

1955 births
2017 deaths
Australian rugby league players
Newtown Jets players
Rugby league players from New South Wales
Rugby league centres